She's Out of My League is a 2010 American romantic comedy film directed by Jim Field Smith and written by Sean Anders and John Morris. It stars Jay Baruchel and Alice Eve, and was produced by Jimmy Miller and David Householter for Paramount Pictures and DreamWorks Pictures. It was filmed in Pittsburgh, Pennsylvania. Production finished in 2008, and it received wide theatrical release on March 12, 2010. It was Smith's first feature film as a director.

Plot
Kirk Kettner is a TSA agent at Pittsburgh International Airport. He attempts to reconcile with his ex-girlfriend Marnie, despite her treating him poorly. Meanwhile, an attractive and successful woman named Molly McCleish arrives at the terminal to board a flight. Kirk is the only TSA agent who does not flirt with or harass her, and saves her from his boss's unwanted advances. After boarding, she realizes she left her cell phone at security, and when her friend Patty calls it for her, Kirk answers. They arrange to meet the following day so he can return it.

The next evening, Kirk and his friend Devon arrive at the Andy Warhol Museum to return Molly's phone. Someone bumps into Kirk, causing him to spill his drink on the museum director. Thinking Kirk did it deliberately, the director tells him and Devon they must leave. As they leave the building, Molly follows them outside. Feeling badly about the misunderstanding, she offers Kirk tickets to a Pittsburgh Penguins hockey game. Kirk brings his friend Stainer to the game, where they meet Molly and her friend Patty. While Stainer and Molly are away from their seats, Patty tells Kirk that Molly is interested in him.

Molly asks Kirk out a few days later and he agrees. Stainer predicts that their relationship will fail—he considers Molly a "10" and Kirk a "5", and that the numerical "chasm" between them is too big. Meanwhile, Patty thinks Molly has  chosen Kirk only because he is "safe" and won't hurt her. On their date, Kirk tells Molly that he dreams of being a pilot; and Molly tells him she almost became a lawyer before realizing her love for event planning. At the end of the night, they kiss in Kirk's car.

Molly accompanies Kirk to a family lunch, where she charms the men and makes Marnie jealous. After returning to Molly's apartment, while making out, Kirk ejaculates prematurely in his pants moments before Molly's parents unexpectedly arrive. Desperate to conceal the stain on his pants, Kirk won't stand to shake hands with Molly's dad, and leaves quickly. Believing he fled to avoid meeting her parents, Molly ignores Kirk's calls. Kirk tracks her down, embarrassingly explains why he had to go, and she forgives him.

At Molly's sister Katie's 21st birthday party, Kirk is troubled by Molly being intentionally vague about Kirk's line of work to her parents. Molly's ex-boyfriend Cam, a stunt pilot, then arrives and alludes to Molly having a physical defect. After the party, they return to Molly's apartment and partially undress. Kirk discovers Molly's "defect" is slightly webbed toes, which Kirk considers so minor that he decides that she is indeed too perfect for him. Upset with Kirk over his insecurities and wishing that there was something wrong with her to justify them being together, Molly confesses that Cam had the same problem. She admits she asked Kirk out because she considered him safe, causing Kirk to break up with her. Kirk resumes his relationship with Marnie and makes plans to attend a family vacation in Branson together.

Later, Stainer asks an ex-girlfriend of his if he was good enough for her, she tells him that his insecurities caused her to end their relationship. Realizing he caused Kirk and Molly's break-up by telling Kirk that Molly was too good for him, Stainer phones Patty and gets her to bring Molly to the airport. Stainer tries to get Kirk off the plane he has boarded, but to no avail. He has Jack stop the plane, causing everyone to have to de-board.  Kirk flees from Marnie, who chases after him, and Kirk breaks up with her in the process. Kirk meets Molly at the terminal gate, where she confesses Kirk's insecurities about himself are justified, but that she wants to be with him regardless. They reconcile and resume their relationship. Later, Kirk surprises Molly with a mystery trip to Cleveland via small aircraft, revealing that he has fulfilled his dream of becoming a pilot.

Cast
 Jay Baruchel as Kirk Kettner, a nerdy and skinny TSA agent.
 Alice Eve as Molly McCleish, a beautiful and successful party planner, who falls in love with Kirk.
 T. J. Miller as Wendell "Stainer", Kirk's friend, who ranks everyone 0-10 and refers to Kirk as a "5" and Molly as a "10". 
 Nate Torrence as Devon, Kirk's sensitive friend, who married the only girl he kissed.
 Mike Vogel as Jack, Kirk's athletic and handsome friend who provides helpful advice to Kirk.
 Lindsay Sloane as Marnie, Kirk's promiscuous former girlfriend, who always despised him until he started dating Molly.
 Krysten Ritter as Patty, Molly's sarcastic best friend.
 Geoff Stults as Cam, Molly's ex-boyfriend and stunt pilot.
 Kyle Bornheimer as Dylan Kettner, Kirk's older brother who has always bullied him.
 Jessica St. Clair as Debbie, Dylan's fiance, who also bullies Kirk.
 Debra Jo Rupp as Mrs. Kettner, Kirk's mother.
 Adam LeFevre as Mr. Kettner, Kirk's father.
 Kim Shaw as Katie McCleish, Molly's sister.
 Sharon Maughan as Mrs. McCleish, Molly's mother.
 Trevor Eve as Mr. McCleish, Molly's father.
 Jasika Nicole as Wendy
 Hayes MacArthur as Ron
 Andy Daly as Mr. Fuller
 Robin Shorr as Tina Jordan, Stainer's love interest.
 Yan Xi as Karen, Devon's wife.

Production
Principal photography commenced on March 31, 2008 at the Mellon Arena, now the former home of the Pittsburgh Penguins hockey team. Filming continued in various locations around Pittsburgh until the end of May 2008, including the Pittsburgh International Airport, The Andy Warhol Museum, Mount Washington, the downtown Regional Enterprise Tower, PNC Park, Market Square, and Century III. Area sound stages were also used. Pluma's Restaurant in Irwin, Pennsylvania was used for bar scenes when shooting at Mellon Arena became impossible due to the Penguins' advancement to the 2008 Stanley Cup Finals. The film was co-produced by Jimmy Miller of Mosaic Media Group, a native of Castle Shannon, Pennsylvania and the brother of comedian Dennis Miller.

Molly's parents, Mr. and Mrs. McCleish, are played by Alice Eve's real-life parents, Sharon Maughan and Trevor Eve.

Reception

Box office
She's Out of My League grossed $32 million in North America and $17.8 million in other territories for a total gross of $49.8 million, against a budget of $20 million.

It opened at #3 at the box office, behind Alice in Wonderland and Green Zone, with an estimated $9.6 million gross.

Critical response
On Rotten Tomatoes, the film has an approval rating of 57% based on 134 reviews, with an average rating of 5.6/10. The site's critical consensus reads, "She’s Out of My League has moments of humor and insight, but it’s bogged down by excessive vulgarity and cartoonishness." On Metacritic the film has score of 46 out of 100, based on 29 critics, indicating "mixed or average reviews". Audiences polled by CinemaScore gave the film an average grade of "B" on a scale of A+ to F.

Critic Roger Ebert of the Chicago Sun-Times gave the film three stars out of four saying, "The movie is not a comedy classic. But in a genre where so many movies struggle to lift themselves from zero to one, it's about, oh, a six point five."
Peter Travers of Rolling Stone gave the film three stars out of four, commenting, "This R-rated blend of the sweet and the raunchy has its heart in the right place."  Jake Tomlinson of Shave Magazine gave the movie four and a half stars out of five and praised the movie "for not throwing in cheap obstacles" and for the "good soundtrack."
Michael O'Sullivan of The Washington Post was less enthused, giving the film one star out of four: "The movie clearly aspires to rise to the smutty-but-sweet synergy of other, better films. But She's Out of My League can't touch them."

Home media
She's Out of My League was released on DVD and Blu-ray on June 22, 2010. As of October 2015, it has grossed $12.5 million in home video sales.

References

External links

 
 

2010 films
2010 romantic comedy films
2010s sex comedy films
American romantic comedy films
American romantic fantasy films
American sex comedy films
DreamWorks Pictures films
2010s English-language films
Films scored by Michael Andrews
Films set in Pennsylvania
Films set in Pittsburgh
Films shot in Pittsburgh
Paramount Pictures films
Films with screenplays by John Morris
Films with screenplays by Sean Anders
2010 directorial debut films
2010s American films